"Phantom Shuffle" is a comedy single by Austen Tayshus. Released in October 1984 as the lead and only single from Austen Tayshus' debut album, When the Ticklers Stopped Quivering. The song peaked at number 16 on the Australian charts.

At the 1984 Countdown Music Awards, the song was nominated for Best Male Performance in a Video.

Track listing
 Vinyl (RRT 613)
Side A "Phantom Shuffle" - 5:15
Side B "The First Televised Parliament" - 4:50

Charts

Weekly charts

References 

1984 singles
1984 in Australia
Song recordings produced by Martin Armiger
Australian comedy
Comedy songs